Howard A. Brody (born June 23, 1949) is an American bioethicist and family physician. He was a professor of family medicine at the University of Texas Medical Branch prior to his retirement from there in 2016. For much of his time at the University of Texas Medical Branch, he was the director of the Institute for the Medical Humanities there. Brody has performed research in the field of placebo studies.

Career
Brody taught medicine at Michigan State University before leaving the faculty there in 2006. From 1985 to 2006, he directed the Center for Ethics and Humanities in the Life Sciences there.

Work
Brody is known for his extensive writing about the placebo effect and about the pharmaceutical industry. He has been critical of increasing medical costs, and has been called a "watchdog" in regard to relationships between pharmaceutical companies and medical research. In 2010, he challenged his fellow physicians to identify tests and treatments that did not produce any benefit, which has been credited with inspiring the Choosing Wisely campaign.

Lawsuit
In 2016, Brody filed a complaint against the University of Texas Medical Branch, alleging that the University discriminated against him by placing him on a leave of absence, cutting his salary significantly, and removing him from his position as director of the Institute for the Medical Humanities. He claimed that this was an unusually harsh punishment for his handling of a sexual assault accusation. This complaint ended up becoming a lawsuit in federal court.

Awards and recognition
In 2009, Brody received the American Society for Bioethics and Humanities' Lifetime Achievement Award. He is a Hastings Center Fellow.

References

Living people
1949 births
Bioethicists
American primary care physicians
Physicians from Texas
University of Texas Medical Branch faculty
Michigan State University faculty
Placebo researchers
Hastings Center Fellows
Members of the National Academy of Medicine